Yunfeng may refer to:

Cloud Peak (Taiwan), or Yunfeng, mountain in Taiwan
Yunfeng Capital, Chinese private equity firm
Yunfeng Dam, concrete gravity dam on the Yalu River which borders China and North Korea